Morse Lamb Goodman (27 May 1917 – 12 December 1993) was the fifth Bishop of Calgary.

Goodman was born in Rosedale, Ontario and educated at the University of Toronto. He was ordained in 1943. and was a curate at St Paul's Fort William and then held incumbencies in Murillo and Winnipeg. He was Dean of Brandon (1960–65) and then Edmonton (1965–67) before his ordination to the episcopate in 1968. He retired in 1983 and died a decade later.

References

1917 births
University of Toronto alumni
Anglican Church of Canada deans
20th-century Anglican Church of Canada bishops
Anglican bishops of Calgary
1993 deaths